The 1986 Pro Bowl was the NFL's 36th annual all-star game which featured the outstanding performers from the 1985 season. The game was played on Sunday, February 2, 1986, at Aloha Stadium in Honolulu, Hawaii before a crowd of 50,101. The final score was NFC 28, AFC 24.

Don Shula of the Miami Dolphins led the AFC team against an NFC team coached by Los Angeles Rams head coach John Robinson. The referee was Bob McElwee.

Phil Simms of the New York Giants was named the game's MVP. Players on the winning NFC team received $10,000 apiece while the AFC participants each took home $5,000.

AFC roster
The players representing the AFC were:

Offense

Defense

Special teams

NFC roster
The players representing the NFC were:

Offense

Defense

Special teams

References

Pro Bowl
Pro Bowl
Pro Bowl
Pro Bowl
Pro Bowl
American football competitions in Honolulu
February 1986 sports events in the United States